AK79 is a collection of unreleased tracks by punk bands active in Auckland, New Zealand in the late 1970s. The album was compiled by Bryan Staff, with artwork from Terence Hogan, and was released by Ripper Records in December 1979.

History
Bands featured on the original compilation include The Scavengers, The Swingers, The Primmers, Proud Scum, Toy Love and The Terrorways. An initial pressing of 500 was sold to a retailer. It was later reissued on LP and cassette via CBS, but deleted in 1982.

The defining record of the Auckland punk scene, it became rare and sought-after over the next decade.

An expanded and remastered CD version of the compilation was compiled by Simon Grigg and Roger Shepherd. This was released jointly by their record labels Propeller Records and Flying Nun Records in November 1993. This issue was expanded to include tracks by The Suburban Reptiles, The Spelling Mistakes, The Features and The Marching Girls, and additional titles from the bands on the original album.

The reissue was remastered and partially remixed by Grigg, with expanded artwork by Andrew B. White. The liner notes were by Grigg, Staff and Terrorways drummer Kerry Buchanan.

On 21 and 22 November 2008 a number of the bands got together for a reunion gig (compered by Bryan Staff) in Auckland, including The Scavengers, Proud Scum,  The Terrorways and The Spelling Mistakes. Neither The Terrorways or Proud Scum had performed since 1980.

A bootleg two-LP edition of AK79, with further unreleased tracks and a 20-page book (including commentary from 30 band members and original punks) was sold at the reunion gig, as well as AK79 T-shirts and other memorabilia.

AllMusic reviewer Chris Woodstra called AK79 "probably the best compilation of New Zealand's entries for punk rock and new wave of the late '70s". Music writer Nick Bollinger included AK79 in his 2009 book 100 Essential New Zealand Albums.

In 2014 the album was named as the second recipient of the Independent Music NZ Classic Record award, presented as part of the 2014 Taite Music Prize.

AK79 was reissued on CD in a remastered version in December 2019 and on double vinyl by Propeller Records and Flying Nun Records in January 2020. It featured the original Ripper Records label design and was the first time the CD tracklisting was released on vinyl.

Track listing

References

External links
 AK79 at Propeller Records
 Dead Can Dance Library contains a complete AK79 image series and track listing
 AK79 Reunion gig photos contains several photos from the AK 79 Reunion gig on November 22, 2008

Compilation albums by New Zealand artists
1980 compilation albums
Punk rock compilation albums